The Tempel Synagogue was a Jewish synagogue in Przemyśl, Poland.

History

The Tempel Synagogue stood on Jagiellonska Street, on the river San. It was dedicated on September 18, 1890. The substantial brick building was built in the Romanesque revival derived style known as Rundbogenstil, a popular architectural style for nineteenth and early twentieth century synagogues. It was designed by architect Stanisław Majerski (1872–1926,) a graduate of the Lwów Politechnical School. Brick red brick, the unplastered building of the synagogue was erected on a square plan. The main door was accessed via a wide staircase. The front wall was crowned by two Moses plaques. The synagogue was modelled on Austrian and Western European synagogues. The interior looked very rich, on the eastern wall there was Aron ha-kodesh, which stood between two boards of the Decalogue. It was the only synagogue in Przemysl where Polish prayers were prayed and services were held on the occasion of the most important public holidays.  Until the war, the synagogue had a choir led by Kantor Rosenberg, accompanied by organ. However, unlike twentieth century Reform synagogues, the Temple had a separate women's gallery while men sat on the first floor. It was burned by the Germans in 1939; the ruins were destroyed by 1956.

Images
 http://przemysl.blogspot.com/2008/12/architecture-of-tempel-and-new.html
 http://www.shtetlinks.jewishgen.org/Przemysl/photos/show_sygag.shtml

See also
 Old Synagogue (Przemyśl)
 New Synagogue (Przemyśl)
 Zasanie Synagogue

References

Synagogues in Przemyśl
Synagogues completed in 1890
Rundbogenstil synagogues
Religious organizations established in 1890
1890 establishments in Europe
19th-century religious buildings and structures in Poland